Mencius; born Meng Ke; or Mengzi (372–289 BC) was a Chinese Confucian philosopher who has often been described as the "second Sage" (“亞聖”), that is, second to Confucius himself. He is part of Confucius' fourth generation of disciples. Mencius inherited Confucius' ideology and developed it further. Living during the Warring States period, he is said to have spent much of his life travelling around the states offering counsel to different rulers. Conversations with these rulers form the basis of the Mencius, which would later be canonised as a Confucian classic.

One primary principle of his work is that human nature is righteous and humane. The responses of citizens to the policies of rulers embodies this principle, and a state with righteous and humane policies will flourish by nature. The citizens, with freedom from good rule, will then allocate time to caring for their wives, brothers, elders, and children, and be educated with rites and naturally become better citizens. This placed him at odds with his near contemporary, Xunzi, who believed that human nature is evil by birth.

Life

Mencius, also known by his birth name Meng Ke, was born in the State of Zou. His birthplace is now within the county-level city of Zoucheng, Shandong Province.

He was an itinerant Chinese philosopher and sage, and one of the principal interpreters of Confucianism. Supposedly, he was a pupil of Confucius's grandson, Zisi. Like Confucius, according to legend, he travelled throughout China for forty years to offer advice to rulers for reform. During the Warring States period (403–221 BC), Mencius served as an official and scholar at the Jixia Academy in the State of Qi (1046 BC to 221 BC) from 319 to 312 BC. He expressed his filial piety when he took three years leave of absence from his official duties for Qi to mourn his mother's death. Disappointed at his failure to effect changes in his contemporary world, he retired from public life.

Mencius was buried in the Cemetery of Mencius (孟子林, Mengzi Lin, also known as 亞聖林, Yasheng Lin), which is located 12 km to the northeast of Zoucheng's central urban area. A stele carried by a giant stone tortoise and crowned with dragons stands in front of his grave.

Mother

Mencius's mother is often held up as an exemplary female figure in Chinese culture. As an expression, the idiom refers to the importance of finding the proper environment for raising children.

Mencius's father Meng Ji (孟激) died when Mencius was very young. His mother  or Meng Mu (孟母)  raised her son alone. They were very poor. At first they lived by a cemetery, where the mother found her son imitating the paid mourners in funeral processions. Therefore, the mother decided to move. The next house was near a market in the town. There the boy began to imitate the cries of merchants (merchants were despised in early China). So the mother moved to a house next to a school. Inspired by the scholars and students, Mencius began to study. His mother decided to remain, and Mencius became a scholar.

Another story further illustrates the emphasis that Mencius's mother placed on her son's education. As the story goes, once when Mencius was young, he was truant from school. His mother responded to his apparent disregard for his education by taking up a pair of scissors and cutting the cloth she had been weaving in front of him. This was intended to illustrate that one cannot stop a task midway, and her example inspired Mencius to diligence in his studies.

There is another legend about his mother and his wife, involving a time when his wife was at home alone and was discovered by Mencius not to be sitting properly. Mencius thought his wife had violated a rite, and demanded a divorce. His mother claimed that it was written in The Book of Rites that before a person entered a room, he should announce his imminent presence loudly to let others prepare for his arrival; as he had not done that in this case, the person who had violated the rite was Mencius himself. Eventually Mencius admitted his fault.

She is one of 125 women of which biographies have been included in the Biographies of Exemplary Women, written by Liu Xiang.

Lineage
Duke Huan of Lu's son through Qingfu was an ancestor of Mencius. He was descended from Duke Yang of the State of Lu. Duke Yang was the son of Bo Qin, who was the son of the Duke of Zhou of the Zhou dynasty royal family. The genealogy is found in the Mencius family tree.

Mencius's descendants lived in Zoucheng in the Mencius Family Mansion, where the Mencius Temple was also built and also a cemetery for Mencius's descendants.

Meng Haoran and Meng Jiao were descendants of Mencius who lived during the Tang dynasty.

During the Ming dynasty, one of Mencius's descendants was given a hereditary title at the Hanlin Academy by the Emperor. The title they held was Wujing Boshi (Doctor of the five classics, 五經博士; 五經博士; Wǔjīng Bóshì). In 1452 Wujing Boshi was bestowed upon the offspring of Mengzi-Meng Xiwen 56th generation and Yan Hui-Yan Xihui 59th generation, the same was bestowed on the offspring of Zhou Dunyi-Zhou Mian 12th generation, the two Cheng brothers (Cheng Hao and Cheng Yi-Chen Keren 17th generation), Zhu Xi-Zhu Ting 9th generation, in 1456–1457, in 1539 the same was awarded to Zeng Can's offspring-Zeng Zhicui 60th generation, in 1622 the offspring of Zhang Zai received the title and in 1630 the offspring of Shao Yong.

One of Mencius's direct descendants was Dr. Meng Chih (Anglicised as Dr. Paul Chih Meng) former director of China House, and director of the China Institute in 1944. Time magazine reported Dr. Meng's age that year as 44. Dr. Meng died in Arizona in 1990 at the age of 90. North Carolina's Davidson College and Columbia University were his alma mater. He was attending a speech along with Confucius descendant H. H. Kung.

In the Republic of China there is an office called the "Sacrificial Official to Mencius" which is held by a descendant of Mencius, like the post of "Sacrificial Official to Zengzi" for a descendant of Zengzi, "Sacrificial Official to Yan Hui" for a descendant of Yan Hui, and the post of "Sacrificial Official to Confucius, held by a descendant of Confucius.

The descendants of Mencius still use generation poems for their names given to them by the Ming and Qing Emperors along with the descendants of the other Four Sages (四氏): Confucius, Zengzi, and Yan Hui.

Historical sites related to his descendants include the Meng family mansion (孟府), Temple of Mencius (孟廟), and Cemetery of Mencius (孟林).

One of Mencius's descendants moved to Korea and founded the Sinchang Maeng clan.

Main concepts

Human nature
Mencius expounds on the concept that the human is naturally righteous and humane. It is the influence of society that causes bad moral character. Mencius describes this in the context of educating rulers and citizens about the nature of man. "He who exerts his mind to the utmost knows his nature" and "the way of learning is none other than finding the lost mind."

The four beginnings (or sprouts)
To show innate goodness, Mencius used the example of a child falling down a well. Witnesses of this event immediately feel 

Human nature has an innate tendency towards goodness, but moral rightness cannot be instructed down to the last detail. This is why merely external controls always fail in improving society. True improvement results from educational cultivation in favorable environments. Likewise, bad environments tend to corrupt the human will. This, however, is not proof of innate evil because a clear thinking person would avoid causing harm to others. This position of Mencius puts him between Confucians such as Xunzi who thought people were innately bad, and Taoists who believed humans did not need cultivation, they just needed to accept their innate, natural, and effortless goodness. The four beginnings/sprouts could grow and develop, or they could fail. In this way Mencius synthesized integral parts of Taoism into Confucianism. Individual effort was needed to cultivate oneself, but one's natural tendencies were good to begin with. The object of education is the cultivation of benevolence, otherwise known as Ren.

Education

According to Mencius, education must awaken the innate abilities of the human mind. He denounced memorization and advocated active interrogation of the text, saying, "One who believes all of a book would be better off without books" (盡信書，則不如無書, from 孟子.盡心下). One should check for internal consistency by comparing sections and debate the probability of factual accounts by comparing them with experience.

Destiny
Mencius also believed in the power of Destiny in shaping the roles of human beings in society. What is destined cannot be contrived by the human intellect or foreseen. Destiny is shown when a path arises that is both unforeseen and constructive. Destiny should not be confused with Fate. Mencius denied that Heaven would protect a person regardless of his actions, saying, "One who understands Destiny will not stand beneath a tottering wall". The proper path is one which is natural and unforced. This path must also be maintained because, "Unused pathways are covered with weeds." One who follows Destiny will live a long and successful life. One who rebels against Destiny will die before his time.

Politics and economics

Mencius emphasized the significance of the common citizens in the state. While Confucianism generally regards rulers highly, he argued that it is acceptable for the subjects to overthrow or even kill a ruler who ignores the people's needs and rules harshly. This is because a ruler who does not rule justly is no longer a true ruler. Speaking of the overthrow of the wicked King Zhou of Shang, Mencius said, "I have merely heard of killing a villain Zhou, but I have not heard of murdering [him as] the ruler."

This saying should not be taken as an instigation to violence against authorities but as an application of Confucian philosophy to society. Confucianism requires a clarification of what may be reasonably expected in any given relationship. All relationships should be beneficial, but each has its own principle or inner logic. A ruler must justify his position by acting benevolently before he can expect reciprocation from the people. In this view, a king is like a steward. Although Confucius admired kings of great accomplishment, Mencius is clarifying the proper hierarchy of human society. Although a king has presumably higher status than a commoner, he is actually subordinate to the masses of people and the resources of society. Otherwise, there would be an implied disregard of the potential of human society heading into the future. One is significant only for what one gives, not for what one takes.

Mencius distinguished between superior men who recognize and follow the virtues of righteousness and benevolence and inferior men who do not. He suggested that superior men considered only righteousness, not benefits. That assumes "permanent property" to uphold common morality.<ref>Yagi, Kiichiro (2008). "China, economics in," The New Palgrave Dictionary of Economics, v. 1, p. 778. Abstract.</ref> To secure benefits for the disadvantaged and the aged, he advocated free trade, low tax rates, and a more equal sharing of the tax burden.

In regards to the Confucian perspective of the marketplace, more about Confucius’ thoughts from Mencius than from the philosopher himself are learned. The government should have a mostly hands-off approach regarding the marketplace. This was in part, to prevent state-run monopolies, however, it was also the state's responsibility to protect against future monopolies that might come into existence. Mencius also advocated for no taxes on imports; the market was to exchange for what you lacked so taxing merchants importing goods would ultimately hurt the villagers. The thought behind this is that people are inherently good and rational and can be trusted to regulate themselves, so price gouging or deception would not be an issue. Taxes on the property were acceptable and to be the only means by which the dukes and states would collect money. They did not need to collect much because taxes were only for supplemental funds. These taxes were also progressive, meaning the families that owned larger, more fertile pieces of land would pay more than the families with uniform land allotments. Scarcity is an issue in any market; however, Mencius emphasizes the reframing of the idea of a scarce resource. Instead of scarce, resources are to be seen as abundant. Resources are gained through work ethic not by any other means so there are no unfair competitions or gains. To preserve these natural resources, they needed to be used or harvested according to their cycles of growth or replenishing. In many cases, posterity has priority over profit.

Influence

Mencius's interpretation of Confucianism has generally been considered the orthodox version by subsequent Chinese philosophers, especially by the Neo-Confucians of the Song dynasty. Mencius's disciples included a large number of feudal lords, and he is said to have been more influential than Confucius had been.

The Mencius (also spelled Mengzi or Meng-tzu), a book of his conversations with kings of the time, is one of the Four Books that Zhu Xi grouped as the core of orthodox Neo-Confucian thought. In contrast to the sayings of Confucius, which are short and self-contained, the Mencius consists of long dialogues, including arguments, with extensive prose. It was generally neglected by the Jesuit missionaries who first translated the Confucian canon into Latin and other European languages, as they felt that the Neo-Confucian school largely consisted of Buddhist and Taoist contamination of Confucianism. Matteo Ricci also particularly disliked what they had believed to be condemnation of celibacy as unfilial, which is rather a mistranslation of a similar word referring more to aspects of personality. François Noël, who felt that Zhu's ideas represented a natural and native development of Confucius's thought, was the first to publish a full edition of the Mencius at Prague in 1711; as the Chinese rites controversy had been recently decided against the Jesuits, however, his edition attained little influence outside central and eastern Europe.

In a 1978 book that estimated the hundred most influential persons in history to that point, Mencius was ranked at 92.

Mencius Institute
The first Mencius Institute was established in Xuzhou, China in 2008 under a collaboration between Jiangsu Normal University, China Zoucheng Heritage Tourism Bureau, and Xuzhou Mengshi Clan Friendship Network.

First Mencius Institute outside of China is located at Universiti Tunku Abdul Rahman (UTAR) Kampar Campus, Malaysia in 2016.

See also

 Cheng Yi (philosopher)
 David Hume, whose ethical naturalism echoes Mencius's
 Lu Jiuyuan
 Sinchang Maeng clan, Mencius is the founder of the Korean clan, Sinchang Maeng clan
 Wang Yangming

Notes

References
Citations

Bibliography

Chan, Alan K. L. (ed.), 2002, Mencius: Contexts and Interpretations, Honolulu: University of Hawaii Press.
Chan, Wing-tsit (trans.), 1963, A Source Book in Chinese Philosophy, Princeton, NJ: Princeton University Press.
Graham, A.C., 1993, Disputers of the Tao: Philosophical Argument in Ancient China, Chicago:  Open Court Press. 
Ivanhoe, Philip J., 2002, Ethics in the Confucian Tradition: The Thought of Mencius and Wang Yangming, 2nd edition, Indianapolis: Hackett Publishing.
 .
 .
 . 
Nivison, David S., 1996, The Ways of Confucianism: Investigations in Chinese Philosophy, La Salle, Illinois: Open Court. (Includes a number of seminal essays on Mencius, including "Motivation and Moral Action in Mencius," "Two Roots or One?" and "On Translating Mencius.")
Shun, Kwong-loi, 1997, Mencius and Early Chinese Thought, Stanford:  Stanford University Press.
Van Norden, Bryan W. (trans.), 2008, Mengzi:  With Selections from Traditional Commentaries, Indianapolis:  Hackett Publishing.
Van Norden, Bryan W., 2007, Virtue Ethics and Consequentialism in Early Chinese Philosophy, New York:  Cambridge University Press. (Chapter 4 is on Mencius.)
Wang, Robin R. (ed.), 2003, Images of Women in Chinese Thought and Culture: Writings from the Pre–Qin Period through the Song Dynasty, Indianapolis: Hackett Publishing. (See the translation of the stories about Mencius's mother on pp. 150–155.)
Yearley, Lee H., 1990, Mencius and Aquinas: Theories of Virtue and Conceptions of Courage'' Albany: State University of New York Press.

External links 

 Internet Encyclopedia of Philosophy entry
Stanford Encyclopedia of Philosophy entry
Mengzi: Chinese text with English translation and links to Zhuxi's commentary
English translation by A. Charles Muller Annotated scholarly translation with Chinese text
Article discussing the view of ethics of Mencius from The Philosopher

 
 

372 BC births
289 BC deaths
4th-century BC Chinese people
4th-century BC Chinese philosophers
3rd-century BC Chinese people
3rd-century BC Chinese philosophers
Chinese Confucianists
Deified Chinese people
Epistemologists
Humanists
Metaphysicians
Ontologists
People from Jining
Philosophers from Lu (state)
Philosophers of culture
Philosophers of education
Philosophers of language
Philosophers of law
Philosophers of mind
Chinese political philosophers
Sinchang Maeng clan
Chinese social commentators
Social philosophers
Zhou dynasty essayists